The West Chadic languages of the Afro-Asiatic family are spoken principally in Niger and Nigeria. They include Hausa, the most populous Chadic language and a major language of West Africa.

Languages
The branches of West Chadic go either by names or by letters and numbers in an outline format.

Hausa–Gwandara (A.1): Hausa, Gwandara
Bole–Angas (?)
Bole–Tangale (A.2)
North (Bole proper): Bure, Karekare, Bole, Gera, Geruma, Deno, Galambu, Giiwo, Kubi, Ngamo, Maaka (Maagha), Ɓeele, Daza (Dazawa), ?Pali
South (Tangale): Kwaami, Pero, Piya-Kwonci, Kholok, Nyam, Kushi (Goji), Kutto (Kupto), Tangale, Dera (Kanakuru)
Angas (Central West Chadic) (A.3)
Ngasic: Ngas (Angas), Belnəng
Mwaghavulic: Mwaghavul, Mupun (Mapun), Takas (Toos); Cakfem-Mushere
Miship (Chip)
Pan cluster
Chakato/Jorto
Jipal, Mernyang (Mirriam), Kwagallak, Kofyar (Doemak), Bwol, Goram, Jibyal
Nteng
Tel (Tɛɛl, Montol)
Talic: Tal, Pyapun, Koenoem
Goemaic: Goemai
Yiwom (Ywom, Gerka)Ron (A.4): Fyer, Tambas, Ron (Bokkos, Daffo-Butura, Mangar, Monguna), Shagawu, Duhwa (Karfa), Kulere (Tof, Richa, Kamwai-Marhai), Mundat, ShaBade–Warji (?)Bade (B.1): Duwai; Bade, Shira (†), Ngizim, Teshenawa (†), Auyokawa (†)Warji (North Bauchi) (B.2): Pa'a; Warji, Diri, Ciwogai, Kariya (Vinahə), Mburku, Miya, Siri, Zumbun (Jimbin), Ajawa (†)Barawa (South Bauchi) (B.3)Zaar: Dass; Geji, Polci (Polchi), Saya, Zari, ZeemGuruntum: Guruntum-Mbaaru, Ju, Tala, ZangwalBoghom: Jimi, Jum; Boghom, Kir-Balar, Mangas

In addition, Poki is unclassified within West Chadic.

Internal structure
George Starostin's (2010) internal classification of West Chadic as presented in Blažek (2010):West ChadicWest Chadic A
Hausa–Gwandara
(branch)
Ron
Bole-Angas
Bole–Tangale
Angas–Sura
West Chadic B
Bade–Ngizim
Bauchi
North Bauchi
South Bauchi

Roger Blench's (2021) internal classification of West Chadic:West Chadic'''
Hausa–Gwandara
Core West Chadic
Ron
Bole–Tangale
Bade–Ngizim
North Bauchi
South Bauchi, A3 (Central-West)

Distribution
Distributions of West Chadic branches:

History of dispersal
Roger Blench (2022) suggests that West Chadic languages may have spread via a gradual agricultural dispersal in Central Nigeria, starting from 3,000-4,000 years ago. Blench notes that West Chadic morphology has been heavily influenced by Plateau languages, likely as a result of long-term intermarriage that occurred as West Chadic incomers took local wives who spoke Plateau languages.

Reconstruction
Although no full reconstruction of West Chadic has been published, reconstructions of numerals for West Chadic and its subgroups have been proposed by Václav Blažek (2018).

Phonology
The labial–velar consonants /kp/ and /gb/, widespread in Plateau and other Niger-Congo languages but uncommon in Chadic languages, can be found in Ron languages and in certain West Chadic A3 and Bole-Tangale languages. These consonants were borrowed from Plateau languages due to intensive long-term contact. However, other phonological features typical of Plateau and Niger-Congo languages such as ATR and vowel harmony are not found in West Chadic languages.

Numerals
Comparison of numerals in individual languages:

References

External links
The Yobe Languages Research Project by the late Russell G. Schuh of UCLA
 West Chadic resources  at africanlanguages.org

Chadic languages
West Chadic languages
Languages of Nigeria